Tropidema chrysocephala is a species of beetle in the family Cerambycidae, and the only species in the genus Tropidema. It was described by Charles Coquerel in 1851.

References

Desmiphorini
Beetles described in 1851
Monotypic beetle genera